Manuel Muñoz (born March 4, 1972, Dinuba, California) is an American novelist, short story writer, and professor at the University of Arizona in Tucson, Arizona.

Biography

Muñoz was born in Dinuba, California, a small city in the Central Valley of California, to a family of Mexican-American farm workers. Despite his family's economic woes – and his occasionally having to lend a hand during the grape harvest – Muñoz performed very well in school.
He graduated from Harvard University in 1994, and went on to earn a Masters in Fine Arts from Cornell University in 1998 He met Helena María Viramontes, who has had an important influence on his work, at Cornell. Muñoz considers her to be "his literary godmother."

He moved to New York City in 2001, where he lived until 2008 when he accepted a position as Assistant Professor of Creative Writing at the University of Arizona in Tucson, Arizona.

Muñoz self-identifies as gay.

Writing career

Muñoz's early writing appeared in various publications, notably Rush Hour, Swink, Epoch, Glimmer Train, Edinburgh Review, and Boston Review. His first collection of short stories, Zigzagger, was published in 2003. Most of the stories in this first tome are set in the rural towns of the Central Valley of California, which resemble his hometown of Dinuba. Muñoz has noted that the Central Valley has functioned as "reservoir of creativity" for him. David Ebershoff in a review for the Los Angeles Times wrote, "Muñoz has created a wholly authentic vision of contemporary California— one that has little to do with coastlines, cities or silicon. ... [Zigzagger] heralds the arrival of a gifted and sensitive writer." Helena María Viramontes wrote that "Zigzagger is not merely a contribution to Latina/o letters, but a major breakthrough."

His second collection of short fiction, The Faith Healer of Olive Avenue, was shortlisted for the 2007 Frank O'Connor International Short Story Award. Like Zigzagger, The Faith Healer of Olive Avenue takes place in a small community in the Central Valley. Jeff Turrentine of The New York Times wrote of the collection: "His stories are far too rich to be classified under the limiting rubrics of "gay" or "Chicano" fiction; they have a softly glowing, melancholy beauty that transcends those categories and makes them universal."

In his first novel, What You See In The Dark (2011), Muñoz moves away from the familiar rural settings of the Central Valley to the set of Alfred Hitchcock's Psycho in 1950s Bakersfield, California. Muñoz uses the second person singular to draw his reader into the novel. A starred review in Publishers Weekly called What You See In The Dark a "stellar first novel. [...] The lyrical prose and sensitive portrayal of the crime's ripple effect in the small community elevate this far beyond the typical noir."

Awards
 2006 National Endowment for the Arts Fellowship 
 2007 Frank O'Connor International Short Story Award shortlisted
 2008 Whiting Award
 2009 PEN/O. Henry Award for his story "Tell Him About Brother John."
 2015 PEN/O. Henry Award for his story "The Happiest Girl in the USA."
 2017 PEN/O. Henry Award for his story "The Reason Is Because"
 The Best American Short Stories 2019 includes "Anyone Can Do It"
 New York Foundation for the Arts Fellowship

Works

References

External links
Profile at The Whiting Foundation
"INTERVIEW WITH MANUEL MUÑOZ", La Bloga, May 28 2007
"Exclusive Interview: Whiting Winner Manuel Munoz on the Writing Vote", mediabistro

American short story writers
1972 births
Harvard University alumni
Cornell University alumni
Living people
American writers of Mexican descent
American gay writers
American male short story writers
LGBT Hispanic and Latino American people
People from Dinuba, California